"Gotta Lotta Love" is a song performed by American recording artist Ice-T. It was released as the third single from the rapper's fifth studio album, Home Invasion. The song was produced by Tracy "Ice-T" Marrow and Donald Lamont, and released in 1994 via  Records. The single peaked at number 24 in the UK.

Track listing

Personnel
 Tracy Lauren Marrow – vocals, lyrics, producer, executive producer
 Donald Lamont – producer
 Michael Gordon Oldfield – songwriter (on Tubular Bells versions)
 Ronin Inc. – (re-)producer, mixing
 Dirk Walter – design & photography
 Hills Archer Ink – artwork & design
 Jorge Hinojosa – management

Charts

References

External links

1993 songs
1994 singles
Ice-T songs
Gangsta rap songs
Songs written by Ice-T
Songs written by Donald D